Heavy is the debut studio album by the rock band Iron Butterfly, released on January 22, 1968.

The first two tracks, "Unconscious Power" and "Possession", were released as the respective sides of a single.

Three of the group's members (Darryl DeLoach, Jerry Penrod, and Danny Weis) left the band shortly after the album was recorded, leaving drummer Ron Bushy and organist Don Ingle to find replacements. Despite being a debut album with no hit single to provide an entry point for the casual listener, Heavy was a commercial success, reaching number 78 on the Billboard Charts and eventually going Gold in the US.

Cover art
The album's artwork depicts the band members playing their instruments beside a large monument of a human ear. It was designed by Armando Busich (artwork) and Joe Ravetz (photography).

Background
Iron Butterfly had amassed a considerable body of material by the time Heavy was recorded, much of which was held over for later albums. In addition to the ten songs on Heavy, songs from this era include "In-A-Gadda-Da-Vida" (later recorded for the album of the same name), "Lonely Boy", "Real Fright", "Filled with Fear" (all later recorded for Ball), "Evil Temptation" (an instrumental version of which was later used as the B-side to "Possession"), "It's All Up to You", and "Gloomy Day to Remember".

Reception

Allmusic's Stephen Thomas Erlewine rated Heavy three-and-a-half out of five stars. He stated that "most of the album was not particularly well written" but that "the band's overwhelmingly loud sonic attack occasionally made up for the weakness in the material."

Track listing

Personnel

Iron Butterfly
 Ron Bushy – drums
 Darryl DeLoach – tambourine, vocals
 Doug Ingle – organ, vocals
 Jerry Penrod – bass, vocals
 Danny Weis – guitar

Technical
 Brian Stone – producer
 Charles Greene – producer
 Armando Busich – artwork
 Joe Ravetz – photography

Singles

US singles
 "Don't Look Down on Me" (non-album track) b/w "Possession" (Early Version)
 "Unconscious Power" b/w "Possession"
 "Iron Butterfly Theme", "Possession" b/w "Get Out of My Life, Woman", "Unconscious Power" (Radio EP)

International singles
 "Iron Butterfly Theme" b/w "So-Lo"

References

Iron Butterfly albums
1968 debut albums
Atco Records albums
Albums produced by Charles Greene (producer)
Albums produced by Brian Stone
Albums recorded at Gold Star Studios